Noor (also spelled Nour) is a class of Iranian military Earth-imaging CubeSat. Two Noor satellites have been launched from the Shahrud Desert in Iran into low-earth orbit aboard three-stage Qased (lit. 'message') space-launch vehicles.

Noor-1, the first Iranian military satellite, was launched on 22 April 2020 to a 425 kilometer orbit and decayed from orbit on 13 April 2022 marking a lifespan of one year, eleven months, and nine days, just past its expected one year service life. Noor-1 carried a photo of former Quds Force Commander Qassem Soleimani and a Quranic verse about overcoming adversaries.

Noor-2, the second and only operational satellite of the Noor class, was launched on 8 March 2022 (during the Sha'baniyah holiday) to a 500 kilometer orbit and continues to provide the Islamic Revolutionary Guard Corps with low-resolution overhead imagery.

The Noor satellite program is a unique development for Iran as it was the first satellite to be developed and launched by the IRGC instead of the Iranian Space Agency.

Reaction to launch

Iran 
IRGC Commander-in-Chief General Hossein Salami remarked "Today, the world’s powerful armies do not have a comprehensive defense plan without being in space. Achieving this superior technology, which takes us into space and expands the realm of our abilities, is a strategic achievement."

United States 
On April 22, 2020 U.S. Department of Defense acknowledged that Iran successfully launched its first military satellite.

Senior Pentagon officials called Iran's satellite launch a provocation. General John Hyten, vice chairman of the Joint Chiefs of Staff, stressed on the Qased satellite carrier technology, saying that "when you have a missile capable of going a very long way... it means that [Iran] has the ability once again to threaten their neighbors, our allies". The satellite itself, however, was dismissed by Space Force General John W. Raymond as "a tumbling webcam in space; unlikely providing intel."

Then President Donald Trump said that the satellite launch is not an advancement on the Iran's missile program and the showcasing "was only for television," while the US is watching Iran very closely.

France 
The French Foreign Ministry condemned Iran's launch of a military satellite into orbit. Concurring with the United States' accusations that the same development would contribute to Iran's offensive ballistic missile program, the Foreign Ministry said "The Iranian ballistics program is a major concern for regional and international security. It contributes to the destabilization of the region and the rise in tensions."

Russia 
Russia's Ambassador to the United Nations, Vasily Nebenzia, remarked to the international body "the ongoing attempts of the United States side to deprive Iran of the right to reap the benefits of peaceful space technology under false pretexts are a cause for serious concern and profound regret."

Other 
Abdel Bari Atwan, the editor-in-chief of Rai al-Youm and Al Quds Al Arabi said that "Iran's recent launched military satellite to space will change the region's equations."

Controversies 

On 29 July 2020, Iranian state-owned Fars News Agency published an article headlined "Al-Udeid Air Base Observed with Noor Satellite" claiming to show an overhead image of the United States' Al Udeid Air Base in Doha, Qatar "a gathering place for the CENTCOM terrorist air force" imaged by the Noor-1 satellite. Online open-source commentators were quick to point out the published image was a recolored Maxar image from Google Earth, still fresh with Google's watermarks.

Operation 
Noor satellites circle the Earth once every 90 minutes.

On 10 May 2022, Iranian Minister of Communication and Information Technology, Issa Zarepour published on his Instagram a low-resolution, true-color, overhead image of the U.S. Navy's Fifth Fleet Base in Bahrain taken from the Noor-2 satellite. The minister's account was banned from Instagram hours later.

References

Further reading

External links

 [Video of launch]

Satellites of Iran
Military satellites
Spacecraft launched in 2020
2020 in Iran
April 2020 events in Iran